"Comin' Home Baby" is a song originally written as an instrumental by Ben Tucker and first recorded by the Dave Bailey Quintet in 1961, and shortly thereafter by Herbie Mann. Lyrics were added by Bob Dorough, and the vocal version became a US Top 40 hit for American jazz singer Mel Tormé in 1962. The song has since been covered numerous times.

Original instrumental recordings
The tune was first recorded by the Dave Bailey Quintet on 6 October 1961, and issued on 2 Feet in the Gutter. It was composed by Dave Bailey's bassist, Ben Tucker.  The original musicians were Frank Haynes (tenor saxophone), Bill Hardman (trumpet), Billy Gardner (piano), Ben Tucker (bass), and Dave Bailey (drums).

The tune was then recorded six weeks later by Herbie Mann, live at the Village Gate, with Tucker again on bass.  Mann's recording, produced by Nesuhi Ertegun and released by Atlantic Records in 1962, became popular and drew wider attention to the tune.

Mel Tormé version
Tucker then persuaded his friend, lyricist Bob Dorough (later of Schoolhouse Rock! fame), to write a lyric for the tune, and producer Nesuhi Ertegun persuaded singer Mel Tormé, who had recently joined the Atlantic label, to record it.   Tormé was initially reluctant to record the song, and later wrote that: "It was a minor-key blues tune with trite repetitious lyrics and an 'answer' pattern to be sung by the Cookies, a girl trio that had once worked for Ray Charles".  The recording took place in New York City on 13 September 1962.

Despite Tormé's reservations, his version of the song, with an arrangement by Claus Ogerman, rose to no.36 on the Billboard pop chart in November 1962, becoming his biggest hit since the early 1950s; it reached no.13 on the UK singles chart. It was also the title track of his album Comin' Home Baby! (with added exclamation mark).  Tormé's recording was nominated as Best Male Solo Vocal Performance and Best Rhythm and Blues Performance at the 1963 Grammy Awards.

Michael Bublé version

"Comin' Home Baby" was recorded by Canadian crooner Michael Bublé, and released as the fifth and final single from his third studio album, Call Me Irresponsible. The single was released on April 25, 2008, exclusively in Germany.  It features vocals from the Grammy Award-winning vocal harmony group Boyz II Men. No video was filmed for the song, and there was little to no promotion, causing the release to not appear in any major charts worldwide. The digital download package features a new remix of the track from Frank Popp. A physical version of the single was also made available in Germany.

Track listing 
 German CD single
 "Comin' Home Baby" (Frank Popp Remix) - 3:09
 "Comin' Home Baby" (Album Version) - 3:27

References

1961 songs
2008 singles
Mel Tormé songs
Michael Bublé songs
Boyz II Men songs
143 Records singles
Reprise Records singles